Hell's Kitchen is a 1998 film starring Rosanna Arquette, William Forsythe, Angelina Jolie, Mekhi Phifer, and Johnny Whitworth. The film was written and directed by Tony Cinciripini. The film had a budget of $6,000,000 but grossed only $4,322 on its opening weekend.

Plot summary

When a robbery goes awry, the bandits end up accidentally killing one of their own. Johnny, one of the robbers, goes to jail for five years. His ex-girlfriend, Gloria, holds him responsible for the death of her brother, the one killed during the robbery. Upon Johnny's release, she wants her new boyfriend to kill him. Only trouble is, the boyfriend knows it wasn't Johnny's fault, and can't bring himself to kill him. Meanwhile, Johnny tries to turn his life around by becoming a boxer and training under a former heavyweight contender.

Cast
 Rosanna Arquette as Liz, Gloria and Hayden's mother
 William Forsythe as Lou, Johnny's trainer and a former heavyweight contender
 Angelina Jolie as Gloria, Johnny's ex-girlfriend
 Mekhi Phifer as Johnny, an ex-con
 Johnny Whitworth as Patty, one of the bandits
 Ryan Slater as Hayden, Gloria's younger brother who was killed during a robbery

Reception
The film received mixed reviews. It holds a 40% rating on Rotten Tomatoes based on 5 reviews.

References

External links
 

1998 films
American crime drama films
1998 crime drama films
1999 drama films
1999 films
1990s English-language films
1990s American films
1998 directorial debut films